Arkadiy Vasilyev (born 19 January 1987) is a Russian decathlete. Vasilyev won the decathlon at the 2006 World Junior Championships in Beijing, China.

References

External links

1987 births
Living people
Russian decathletes
Russian male athletes
Place of birth missing (living people)